Chisocheton macranthus is a tree in the family Meliaceae. The specific epithet  is from the Greek meaning "large-flowered".

Description
The young twigs and branches are up to 1.5 inches (four centimeters) thick; intermediate between mesocaul and pachycaul. The flowers are creamy-pink.

Distribution and habitat
Chisocheton macranthus is found in Borneo and the Philippines. The habitat is lowland rain forests from sea-level to  altitude.

References

macranthus
Trees of Borneo
Trees of the Philippines
Plants described in 1908